The Midwest Professional Basketball League was a professional American basketball league. The six–team league existed for three seasons, playing from 1961–1962 through 1963–1964 until the league folded after the 1964 season.

History and Franchises

The league was composed of six teams per season. The charter members of the Midwest Professional Basketball League in 1961–1962 were the Battle Creek Warriors, Dayton Little Mickeys, East Chicago Bombers, Gary Whips, Terre Haute All–Stars and Toledo Twisters. The Gary Whips had the best league record at 9–4.

In 1962–1963, Battle Creek and Terre Haute did not return to Midwest Professional Basketball League play and were replaced by Holland and Grand Rapids franchises. The second season teams were the Chicago Bombers, Dayton Mickeys, Grand Rapids Tackers, Gary Whips, Holland Oilers and Toledo Tartans. The Holland Oilers defeated Toledo for the MPBL Championship.

In 1963–1964, the Midwest Professional Basketball League began the season with five teams and dropped to four, with the season divided into halves. Gary folded after the first half. The five teams to begin the season were the Battle Creek Warriors, Chicago Bombers, Gary Steelers, Grand Rapids Tackers and Holland Oilers. Grand Rapids won both halves and played the Allentown Jets of the Eastern Professional Basketball League in a post season championship. Allentown won the game by the score of 128–126.

League Notes
The 1963–1964 Most Valuable Player was Nick Mantis of Grand Rapids.

The 1962–1963 First Team: Charlie North, Grand Rapids; Willie Merriweather, Holland; M.C. Burton, Toledo; George Knighton, Dayton; Floyd Campbell, Gary.

The 1963–1964 First Team:Nick Mantis, Grand Rapids; Ed Burton, Holland; Willie Lee Bond, Chicago; M.C. Burton, Grand Rapids; Willie Merriweather, Holland.

Reggie Harding, the first high school player ever drafted by the NBA played for Holland. Holland was owned and coached by Gene Schrotenboer and played at the Holland Civic Center.

Notable alumni

 Joe Buckhalter, Dayton
 M. C. Burton Jr., Toledo
 Ed Burton, Howell
 Johnny Cox, Holland, Battle Creek
 Jimmy Darrow, Holland
 Don Goldstein. Terra Haute
 Chuck Grigsby, Dayton
 Reggie Harding, Holland
 Ron Kramer, Battle Creek, Toledo
 Nick Mantis, Grand Rapids 
 Porter Meriwether, Chicago
 John Tidwell, Battle Creek
 Pete Tillotson, Holland
 Dave Zeller, Dayton

Midwest Professional Basketball League Franchises (1961–1964)

Battle Creek Warriors                      1961–62, 1963–64

East Chicago Bombers                       1961–62, 
Chicago Bombers                            1962-63 to 1963-64

Dayton Little Mickeys                      1961–62,
Dayton Mickeys                             1962–63

Gary Steelers                              1963–64, 
Gary Whips                                 1961–62 to 1962–63

Grand Rapids Tackers                       1962–63 to 1963–64

Holland Oilers                             1962–63 to 1963–64

Terre Haute All-Stars                      1961–62

Toledo Twisters                            1961–62,
Toledo Tartans                             1962–63

References

Defunct basketball leagues in the United States
Sports leagues established in 1961
Sports leagues disestablished in 1964
1961 establishments in the United States
1964 disestablishments in the United States